Finland sent 56 athletes to the 2006 European Athletics Championships in Gothenburg.

Results

List of Finnish results, where Athletes reached the Final in that event. (Heats/Quarter-Finals/Semi-Final scores will not be recorded)

Competitors

Nations at the 2006 European Athletics Championships
European Athletics Championships
2006